Monika is a 1974 Italian comedy film directed by Mario Imperoli. It marked the film debut of the Italian sexy comedy icon Gloria Guida, who later worked again with Imperoli in Blue Jeans.

Plot
Monika is a pretty fifteen-year-old from a wealthy family and left much to herself. She has a relationship with Leo, a student older than she, who often accompanies her in the car. Over time, however, Monika gets closer and closer to one of her professors, Bruno de Angelis, a non-conformist teacher of art history.

Following an inappropriate episode at her sixteen-year birthday party, Monika decides that Leo isn't the right guy for her and starts falling in love with the professor. The latter and Monika, one day, have an interesting conversation about love and its meaning. The conversation ends with a kiss and the professor and Monika make love, but he is at the same time the lover of the wife of the lawyer Moroni, who in turn is in love with Monika.

When Monika discovers the professor's secrets, Moroni tries to console her, but exaggerates and forces Monika to flee. During the chase the lawyer accidentally loses his life.

Cast 
 Gloria Guida: Monika
 Colette Descombes: Sandra Moroni
 Paolo Carlini: Avv. Massimo Moroni
 Gian Luigi Chirizzi: Leo

References

External links

1974 films
Commedia sexy all'italiana
Films directed by Mario Imperoli
1970s sex comedy films
Films scored by Nico Fidenco
Teensploitation
1974 comedy films
1970s Italian films